The 1969 Middle Tennessee Blue Raiders football team represented Middle Tennessee State University—as a member of the Ohio Valley Conference (OVC) during the 1969 NCAA College Division football season. Led by Donald E. Fuoss in his first and only season as head coach, the Blue Raiders compiled a record an overall record of 1–9 with a mark of 1–6 in conference play, placing last out of eight teams in the OVC.

Schedule

References

Middle Tennessee
Middle Tennessee Blue Raiders football seasons
Middle Tennessee Blue Raiders football